Glades are an Australian electronica indie pop band composed of vocalist/guitarist Karina Savage and multi-instrumentalist producers Cameron Robertson and Joseph Wenceslao. The trio met at William Clarke College in Kellyville, New South Wales and formed Glades in 2015. The band's name comes from a ski run band member Robertson saw on during a holiday in the snow.

Career
In 2015, the band uploaded a cover of fellow Australian Troye Sivan's "Fools" on SoundCloud and received an early endorsement from Sivan himself. 

The band signed to EMI Australia in 2016 and in October, following the success of their breakthrough single "Drive," which has since accumulated 40 million streams, released their debut extended play, This is What It's Like.

In November 2018, following the success of their biggest hit, "Do Right", which has since accumulated 60 million streams, the band released their debut studio album, To Love You.

In 2018, Glades embarked on their To Love You Tour, which began in Melbourne on the 24th of November and concluded in Brisbane on the 7th of December.

Their second studio album, Planetarium was released on 30 April 2021.

Band members 
 Karina Savage – vocals, guitar
 Cam Robertson – multi-instrumentalist, production
 Joey Wenceslao – multi-instrumentalist, production

Discography

Studio albums

Extended plays

Singles

As lead artists

As featured artists

Notes

References

External links 
 

 

2015 establishments in Australia
Australian electronic music groups
Australian indie pop groups 
Musical groups established in 2015
New South Wales musical groups